Deepsea Challenger (DCV 1) is a  deep-diving submersible designed to reach the bottom of Challenger Deep, the deepest-known point on Earth. On 26 March 2012, Canadian film director James Cameron piloted the craft to accomplish this goal in the second crewed dive reaching the Challenger Deep. Built in Sydney, Australia, by the research and design company Acheron Project Pty Ltd, Deepsea Challenger includes scientific sampling equipment and high-definition 3-D cameras; it reached the ocean's deepest point after two hours and 36 minutes of descent from the surface.

Development 
Deepsea Challenger was built in Australia, in partnership with the National Geographic Society and with support from Rolex, in the Deepsea Challenge program. The construction of the submersible was headed by Australian engineer Ron Allum. Many of the submersible developer team members hail from Sydney's cave-diving fraternity including Allum himself with many years' cave-diving experience.

Working in a small engineering workshop in Leichhardt, Sydney, Allum created new materials including a specialized structural syntactic foam called Isofloat, capable of withstanding the huge compressive forces at the  depth. The new foam is unique in that it is more homogeneous and possesses greater uniform strength than other commercially available syntactic foam yet, with a specific density of about 0.7, will float in water. The foam is composed of very small hollow glass spheres suspended in an epoxy resin and comprises about 70% of the submarine's volume.

The foam's strength enabled the Deepsea Challenger designers to incorporate thruster motors as part of the infrastructure mounted within the foam but without the aid of a steel skeleton to mount various mechanisms. The foam supersedes gasoline-filled tanks for flotation as used in the historic bathyscaphe Trieste.

Allum also built many innovations, necessary to overcome the limitations of existing products (and presently undergoing development for other deep sea vehicles). These include pressure-balanced oil-filled thrusters;
LED lighting arrays; new types of cameras; and fast, reliable penetration communication cables allowing transmissions through the hull of the submersible. Allum gained much of his experience developing the electronic communication used in Cameron's Titanic dives in filming Ghosts of the Abyss, Bismarck and others.

Power systems for the submarine were supplied by lithium batteries that were housed within the foam and can be clearly seen in publicity photographs of the vessel. The lithium battery charging systems were designed by Ron Allum.
The submersible contains over 180 onboard systems, including batteries, thrusters, life support, 3D cameras, and LED lighting. These interconnected systems are monitored and controlled by a programmable automation controller (PAC) from Temecula, California-based controls manufacturer Opto 22. During dives, the control system also recorded depth, heading, temperature, pressure, battery status, and other data, and sent it to the support ship at three-minute intervals via an underwater acoustic communication system developed by West Australian company L-3 Nautronix.

The crucial structural elements, such as the backbone and pilot sphere that carried Cameron, were engineered by the Tasmanian company Finite Elements. The design of the interior of the sphere, including fireproofing, condensation management and mounting of control assemblies, was undertaken by Sydney-based industrial design consultancy Design + Industry.

Specifications 
The sphere sits at the base of the  vehicle. The vehicle operates in a vertical attitude, and carries  of ballast weight that allows it to both sink to the bottom, and when released, rise to the surface. If the ballast weight release system fails, stranding the craft on the seafloor, a backup galvanic release is designed to corrode in salt water in a set period of time, allowing the sub to automatically surface. Deepsea Challenger is less than one-tenth the weight of its predecessor of fifty years, the bathyscaphe Trieste; the modern vehicle also carries dramatically more scientific equipment than Trieste, and is capable of more rapid ascent and descent.

Dives

Early dives 
In late January 2012, to test systems, Cameron spent three hours in the submersible while submerged just below the surface in Australia's Sydney Naval Yard. Power system fluctuations and unforeseen currents presented unexpected challenges.

On 4 March 2012, a record-setting dive to more than  stopped short of the bottom of the New Britain Trench when problems with the vertical thrusters led Cameron to return to the surface. There, he found a wide plain of loose sediment, anemones, jellyfish and varying habitats where the plain met the walls of the canyon.

Challenger Deep 
On 18 March 2012, after leaving the testing area in the relatively calm Solomon Sea, the submersible was aboard the surface vessel Mermaid Sapphire, docked in Apra Harbor, Guam, undergoing repairs and upgrades, and waiting for a calm enough ocean to carry out the dive. By 24 March 2012, having left port in Guam days earlier, the submersible was aboard one of two surface vessels that had departed the Ulithi atoll for the Challenger Deep.

On 26 March 2012 it was reported that it had reached the bottom of the Mariana Trench.

Descent, from the beginning of the dive to arrival at the seafloor, took two hours and 37 minutes, almost twice as fast as the descent of Trieste. A Rolex watch, "worn" on the sub's robotic arm, continued to function normally throughout the dive. Not all systems functioned as planned on the dive: bait-carrying landers were not dropped in advance of the dive because the sonar needed to find them on the ocean floor was not working, and hydraulic system problems hampered the use of sampling equipment. Nevertheless, after roughly three hours on the seafloor and a successful ascent, further exploration of the Challenger Deep with the unique sub was planned for later in the Spring of 2012.

Records 
On 26 March 2012, Cameron reached the bottom of the Challenger Deep, the deepest part of the Mariana Trench. It was the fourth-ever dive to the Challenger Deep and the second crewed dive (with a maximum recorded depth slightly less than that of Trieste 1960 dive). It was the first solo dive and the first to spend a significant amount of time (three hours) exploring the bottom.

Subsequent events 
Deepsea Challenger was donated to Woods Hole Oceanographic Institution for the studies of its technological solutions in order to incorporate some of those solutions into other vehicles to advance deep-sea research. On 23 July 2015, it was transported from Woods Hole Oceanographic Institution to Baltimore to be shipped to Australia for a temporary loan. While on a flatbed truck on Interstate 95 in Connecticut, the truck caught fire, resulting in damage to the submersible. The likely cause of the fire was from the truck's brake failure which ignited its rear tires. Connecticut fire officials speculated that it was a total loss to the Deepsea Challenger; however, the actual extent of the damage was not reported. The submersible was transported back to Woods Hole Oceanographic Institution after the fire.  it had been moved to California for repairs.

The Deepsea Challenger was exhibit in the Natural History Museum of Los Angeles County from 12th December 2022 to 20th February 2023.

Similar efforts 
Several other vehicles were developed to reach the same depths, but not all made it. 
 Triton Submarines, a Florida-based company that designs and manufactures private submarines, whose vehicle, Triton 36000/3, would carry a crew of three to the seabed in 120 minutes. Triton launched DSV Limiting Factor to the bottom of the Marianas trench in August 2019. It has made more than 20 successful crewed dives to Challenger Deep.
 Virgin Oceanic, sponsored by Richard Branson's Virgin Group, developed a submersible designed by Graham Hawkes, DeepFlight Challenger, with which the solo pilot would take 140 minutes to reach the seabed. The Challenger Deep mission for DeepFlight Challenger was scrapped after Virgin discovered it was worthy of only a single dive, not the repeated missions planned.
 DOER Marine, a San Francisco Bay Area based marine technology company established in 1992, announced that was developing a vehicle, Deepsearch (and Ocean Explorer HOV Unlimited), with some support from Google's Eric Schmidt. It would have a crew of two or three and take 90 minutes to reach the seabed, as the program Deep Search.
 The Chinese government launched Fendouzhe (Striver) to Challenger Deep on 10 November 2020. Three people were on board, the largest crew ever to dive Challenger Deep.

See also

References

External links 

 
 Article on usage of Computational Fluid Dynamics during the design process of the Deepsea Challenger
 NGS video: Cameron's return from Challenger Deep
 , a 2014 National Geographic Channel documentary.

2012 in science
James Cameron
Deepsea Challenge 
Deepsea Challenger 
Research submarines
2012 ships